Santiago Cortés Méndez  (19 January 1945 – 25 July 2011) was a footballer from El Salvador.

International career
Cortés represented his country at the 1970 FIFA World Cup in Mexico.

Death
Santiago Cortes Mendez, who figured as midfielder for the national team of El Salvador who participated in the 1970 World Cup in Mexico, died on Monday, 25 July 2011 in Los Angeles at age 66, after suffering in recent months of brain cancer.

References

External links
Sentido pesame a la familia de Santiago Cortez Mendez, heroe Marciano, campeon en 1970 y mundialista con la seleccion de El Salvador en Mexico 70 - CD Atlético Marte

1945 births
2011 deaths
Association football central defenders
Salvadoran footballers
El Salvador international footballers
1970 FIFA World Cup players
C.D. Atlético Marte footballers
Deaths from brain cancer in the United States